The Glen may refer to:

Places

Australia 

 The Glen, Queensland, a locality in the Southern Downs Region

Canada 

 The Glen, Ontario, a community in Renfrew County, Ontario, Canada

Ireland 

The Glen, Cork, a residential area of Cork, Munster Province, Ireland

New Zealand 

The Glen, New Zealand, a suburb of Dunedin, South Island

United Kingdom 

The Glen, Scottish Borders, an estate and country house in Scotland
The Glen, Western Isles, a location in Scotland

United States 

The Glen, New York, a place in Warren County, New York, United States
The Glen, San Antonio, an African-American neighborhood in Texas, United States
 The Glen, a development in Glenview, Illinois, United States

Other
 "The Glen" (Bradley Joseph song), a 1998 composition
 The Glen, nickname for Watkins Glen International, an auto racetrack at Seneca Lake, New York, United States

See also
 The Glen Nature Reserve, in the Hunter Region, New South Wales, Australia
 The Glen Shopping Centre, in Glen Waverley, Victoria, Australia
 Glen (disambiguation)